Kirsten De Laender (born July 22, 1993) is a Belgian Paralympian. Her first Paralympics was London 2012, where she won a bronze medal in boccia for mixed pairs BC3. De Laender also competed in the 2016 Summer Paralympics in Rio de Janeiro.

Career 
At the 2010 Boccia World Championships in Lisbon, she won a bronze medal as part of a pair. 

At the 2012 Summer Paralympics, in London, she won a bronze medal in Mixed Pairs BC3, with Pieter Cilissen and Pieter Verlinden. She also competed in Mixed Individual BC3.

At the 2016 Summer Paralympics, she competed in Boccia Mixed Pairs BC3.

References

External links 

 Belgium's Kirsten de Laender in action during the Boccia mixed pairs BC3 bronze medal match
1993 births
Paralympic bronze medalists for Belgium
Belgian sportspeople
Living people